The Harvester is a 1936 American comedy film directed by Joseph Santley and written by Homer Croy, Robert Lee Johnson, Elizabeth Meehan and Gertrude Orr. It is based on the 1911 novel The Harvester by Gene Stratton-Porter, which had previously been turned into a 1927 silent film of the same title. The film stars Alice Brady, Russell Hardie, Ann Rutherford, Frank Craven, Cora Sue Collins and Emma Dunn. The film was released on April 18, 1936, by Republic Pictures.

Plot
In rural 1890s Indiana, farmer David Langston, a single man who has focused his time on his work, is pressured to wed the daughter of the wealthy Mrs. Biddle, Thelma. While David's orphaned friend, Ruth Jameson, is in love with him, David ends up accepting Mrs. Biddle's demands and agrees to wed Thelma. After technological advancements make their way to the town, Mrs. Biddle attempts to pressure David to leave his job as a farmer and join her husband, Mr. Biddle, in a career of real estate. However, Mr. Biddle, who is discontented with his current life, cautions David against selling his farm. Meanwhile, Mrs. Biddle, in an effort to secure David's marriage to her daughter, has Ruth's younger sister, Naomi, whom he adores, put into an orphanage.

Soon after, Ruth's grandmother, who opposed David's marriage to Thelma, dies, David and Ruth are drawn closer together, making David question his decision, and soon figures out Mrs. Biddle put Naomi in the orphanage. David then publicly confronts Mrs. Biddle, and boldly announces his intentions to adopt Naomi himself. Thelma, infuriated, breaks their engagement, and Ruth, David, and Naomi are reunited, with David deciding to remain a harvester.

Criticisms of the Film 
This adaptation of the original 1911 novel by Gene Stratton-Porter features many plot differences, which some claim detract from the overall quality of the film. This is especially true considering how well received the novel was at publication. According to a review published by the New York Times, there "has been lost the simple nobility of its central figure that made the book a best seller when it was written." The author of this review, referenced as J.T.M., claims the movie could not be seen as parallel to the vision Stratton-Porter had when writing the novel. The portrayal of the titular figure, David Langston, is seen as "a most naïve young man, far too easily urged away from his herb patches and the rural destiny that so patently befits him by an extremely transparent plot of feminine scheming."

Cast
Alice Brady as Mrs. Biddle
Russell Hardie as David Langston
Ann Rutherford as Ruth Jameson
Frank Craven as Mr. Biddle
Cora Sue Collins as Naomi Jameson
Emma Dunn as Granny Moreland
Joyce Compton as Thelma Biddle
Edward Nugent as Bert Munroe
Roy Atwell as Jake Eben
Spencer Charters as Stubby Pratt
Russell Simpson as Abner Prewett
Phyllis Fraser as Gladys
Fern Emmett as Miss Sophronia
Burr Caruth as Dr. Carey
Lucille Ward as Mrs. Griggs
Harry Bowen as Carl
Grace Hayle as Mrs. Kramer

References

External links
 

1936 films
1930s English-language films
American comedy films
1936 comedy films
Republic Pictures films
Films directed by Joseph Santley
American black-and-white films
Films produced by Nat Levine
Films based on works by Gene Stratton-Porter
Films based on American novels
Remakes of American films
Sound film remakes of silent films
1930s American films